The 1948 Washington gubernatorial election was held on November 2, 1948. Republican nominee Arthur B. Langlie defeated incumbent Democrat Monrad Wallgren with 50.50% of the vote in a rematch of the 1944 contest.

Primary elections
Primary elections were held on September 14, 1948.

Candidates 
Arthur B. Langlie, former Governor
Monrad Wallgren, incumbent Governor
Clarence D. Martin, State Representative and former Governor
John T. McCutcheon, State Senator
Robert F. Waldron, former State Representative
James M. Greene
George J. Smith
Marius Rasmussen
Clark R. Belknap
Richard C. Beam
L.R. "Lal" Kemoe

Results

General election

Candidates
Major party candidates
Arthur B. Langlie, Republican 
Monrad Wallgren, Democratic

Other candidates
Russell H. Fluent, Progressive
Henry Killman, Socialist Labor
Daniel Roberts, Socialist Workers

Results

References

1948
Washington
Gubernatorial